Zoltan Spirandelli is a German film director, actor, producer, and screenwriter.

Born in 1957 in Königstein, he has Italian ancestors of his father's side.  His first name is Hungarian. As a child he was cantor in the choir of St. John Church in Kronberg. He has worked at the Hochschule für Musik und Theater Hamburg while he made the short film Lulu. For about ten years he directed short films gaining popularity with his interactive short film The Cock Is Dead. He has since made numerous films for television and worked with actors such as Andrea Sawatzki, Matthias Schweighöfer, Daniel Brühl, Rufus Beck and Ottfried Fischer. He received the Bavarian film award for his only previous feature-length movie Vaya con Dios.

He is the father of Ivan Spirandelli and Karla Spirandelli. Today he lives in Berlin.

Filmography
 1984: Road Movie (short film)
 1985: Lulu (short film)
 1988: The Cock Is Dead (interactive short film) + actor
 1989: Now All Forests Rest
 1993: Like Erwin Struntz sex movie made (short film with live-Narrator) + writer, Narrator
 1995: Anecdote from the last Prussian wars (short film with live-Narrator) + writer, producer
 1996: Monika (MO-ni-ka) (short film)
 1998: Ufos over Waterlow (TV) + actor
 2000: Forbidden desire - I love my students (the sinner) (TV)
 2001: Jonathan's love (TV)
 2002: Vaya con Dios
 2002: A real man for mum (TV)
 2004: Inspektor Rolle: heart in emergency (TV series, season 2, episode 1)
 2004: Inspektor Rolle: death of a model (TV series, season 2, episode 2) + script
 2004: The colours of love (TV) + actor
 2005: sleeping bag for two (beetles for breakfast) (TV)
 2005: Seduction for beginners (TV)
 2005: Caution mother-in-law! (TV)
 2006: King Otto (TV)
 2006: Kiss is on trial (TV)
 2007: How to kiss a millionaire? (TV)
 2008: Full House (TV series, season 1, Episode 4)
 2008: Everything is what legal (TV)
 2008: Stormy times (TV)
 2009: Doktor Martin - fed (TV series, season 2, Episode 4)
 2009: Doktor Martin - thoughts on (TV series, season 2, episode 5)
 2009: Flemming - the mistress of emotions (TV series, season 1, Episode 4)
 2009: Flemming - das hohe lied (TV series, season 1, episode 5)
 2009: Flemming - burnt soil (TV series, season 1, Episode 6)
 2010: The Golgotha Case (TV)
 2011: Tatort - Grabenkämpfe

Awards
 1993 federal short film award,
 1986 award of the German film critics in the category of best experimental film for Lulu
 1988 award of the German film critics in the category best experimental film
 2001 Bavarian film awards in the category of up-and-coming Director for Vaya con Dios

References

German male actors
Mass media people from Hesse
People from Hochtaunuskreis
1957 births
Living people